Orchard House Yard (known as Orchard Yard and Hercules Wharf) was an English shipbuilding yard located at Leamouth, on the River Lea at Bow Creek . Forming part of the Orchard House estate,  a number of shipbuilders occupied the site over time:

 1840 Ditchburn & Mare
 1846 C J Mare & Co
 1857 Thames Ironworks and Shipbuilding Company Ltd
 1873(pre) Joseph Spencer Watson
 1889 W J Jolly
 1890 H H Mackenzie/Mackenzie, MacAlpine & Co.

The only known surviving vessel built at the yard is SS Robin, a 300-ton steam-powered coaster which is part of the National Historic Fleet and the last of her type still in existence. She was built at Orchard House Yard in 1890 by Mackenzie and is currently located a short distance away in the Royal Victoria Dock.

References

External links
Orchard House - an account dating from 1935 by Charles Lammin
Leamouth Road and Orchard Place: Historical development, Survey of London: volumes 43 and 44: Poplar, Blackwall and Isle of Dogs (1994), pp. 646-655

See also

Canals of the United Kingdom
History of the British canal system

Former buildings and structures in the London Borough of Tower Hamlets
History of the London Borough of Tower Hamlets
Shipbuilding in London
Districts of London on the River Thames
Port of London